KVPI may refer to:

 KVPI (AM), a radio station (1050 AM) licensed to Ville Platte, Louisiana, United States
 KVPI-FM, a radio station (92.5 FM) licensed to Ville Platte, Louisiana, United States